Daniel Waggoner Log House and Barn is a historic home and barn located at Potter Township, Centre County, Pennsylvania. The log house was built about 1809, and is a two-story dwelling with a gable roof, measuring 32 feet by 28 feet. Also on the property is a contributing log barn, also built about 1809.

It was added to the National Register of Historic Places in 1979.

References

Houses on the National Register of Historic Places in Pennsylvania
Houses completed in 1809
Houses in Centre County, Pennsylvania
National Register of Historic Places in Centre County, Pennsylvania